The eighth series of The Only Way Is Essex, a British semi-reality television programme, began airing on 24 February 2013 on ITV2. The series consisted of 12 episodes. Series 8 marked the first series not to feature Lydia Bright, after her departure from the series in December 2012. The series also saw the departure of numerous supporting cast members and introduced new supporting cast members.

On 7 March 2013, Mecklenburgh confirmed via her Twitter account that Amy and Sally Broadbent had been used by the show and had been dropped from the cast. On 8 March 2013 Mick Norcross who has appeared from the second series announced his departure from the show. This series also saw the departure of Kirk Norcross for the second time after announcing on Twitter that he had quit the show on 21 March 2013. Cast member Debbie Douglas also announced her departure from the show via Twitter on 29 March 2013.

Storylines
Series 8 of The Only Way Is Essex includes Lucy and Mario's turbulent relationship temporarily coming to an end following numerous cheating allegations. Little Chris' brother, Ben, tells his version of events on the night of the alleged cheating leaving Mario angry as Little Chris sides with his brother over him. Mario and Lucy then decide to take a break from Essex to work things out between them. They return together again but still angry at Little Chris. Ricky attempts to get Mario and Little Chris on speaking terms again but it all ends in arguments as Lucy gets involved again.

Joey also announced that he would be opening his new shop, Fusey, before giving job interviews. The shop opening was a success. At the end of the series he revealed to Billie that he is going to propose to Sam in Dubai. Sam accepted the proposal and they returned for their engagement party.

Cast

Cast Departures

Mick Norcross
On 8 March 2013 it was announced that Mick Norcross had left the series and had banned cameras from filming in his nightclub, Sugar Hut following his departure feeling the show had given the club a negative reputation. Norcross only appeared in episode 1 of the series before departing following the airing of the fourth episode.

Kirk Norcross
On 21 March 2013, Kirk announced on Twitter that he had left the series due to the show changing too much.

Debbie Douglas
On 29 March 2013, Debbie announced her departure from the show on Twitter saying, "For everyone who has been asking me where I have been on recent episodes of TOWIE, I have made the decision to leave the show." Douglas only appeared during episodes 2–4 during this series.

Billi Mucklow
On 24 May 2013, it was announced that Billi had been axed from the show following shake-ups of the cast. Billi had appeared in the show from series 3–8, although after the departure best friend and former cast member Cara Kilbey, she didn't feature in the series as often. During her time on the show she had a brief fling with Kirk Norcross and then dated Tom Kilbey.

Danni-Park Dempsey
On 24 May 2013, it was confirmed that Danni had been axed from the show. Danni had appeared in the show from series 5–8. Following the departure of her best friend and former cast member Lydia Bright, Danni didn't feature in the show as often as she had previously. During her time on the show she briefly dated Charlie King.

Darrell Privett
On 24 May 2013, it was revealed that Darrell had been axed from the show. Darrell had featured in the show briefly from series 6–8. During his time on the show he briefly dated Chloe Sims but previously dated Lauren Pope off screen.

Episodes

{| class="wikitable plainrowheaders" style="width:100%; background:#fff;"
|- style="color:white"
! style="background:#FF5C8B;"| Seriesno.
! style="background:#FF5C8B;"| Episodeno.
! style="background:#FF5C8B;"| Title
! style="background:#FF5C8B;"| Original airdate
! style="background:#FF5C8B;"| Duration
! style="background:#FF5C8B;"| UK viewers

|}

Reception

Ratings

References

The Only Way Is Essex
2013 in British television
2013 British television seasons